Aḥmad ibn Thaqabah ibn Rumaythah ibn ibn Muḥammad Abī Numayy al-Ḥasanī (d. June 1409) was a co-Emir of Mecca during the reign of his cousin Inan ibn Mughamis. He died in late Muharram 812 AH (June 1409).

Notes

References

Year of birth missing
1409 deaths
Emirs